Andrew Joseph Muscato (born November 26, 1985) is an American film director and producer. He is known for the documentary films The Zen of Bobby V., Schooled: The Price of College Sports, New Worlds: The Cradle of Civilization and the feature film The Greatest Beer Run Ever.

Life and career
Muscato was born in Morristown, New Jersey. He was raised in the Basking Ridge section of Bernards Township, New Jersey, where he attended Ridge High School. He graduated from New York University Tisch School of the Arts. In 2008, he produced his first feature documentary The Zen of Bobby V for ESPN. He is the co-founder of the Production Company Makuhari Media, along with Bobby Valentine. The company produces sports themed documentaries. In 2013, he directed his debut feature documentary Branca's Pitch, about professional baseball pitcher Ralph Branca.

Muscato produced and narrated an episode of ESPN's 30 for 30 podcast series. The episode, "The Loophole" (Season 4, Episode 4), chronicles Japanese baseball pitcher Hideo Nomo's journey to Major League Baseball. It debuted in November 2018.

A year later, Muscato produced a three-part investigative documentary for The Athletic into head trauma research at UNC-Chapel Hill. The documentary, "Failure to Disclose" was hosted by Armen Keteyian.

In 2021, he directed the concert documentary, New Worlds: The Cradle of Civilization, an Official Selection of the 74th Cannes Film Festival. Most recently, he produced The Greatest Beer Run Ever, which premiered at the 2022 Toronto International Film Festival.

Filmography

Awards and nominations

References

External links
 

1985 births
Living people
American documentary film directors
American documentary film producers
American film producers
Filmmakers from New Jersey
People from Bernards Township, New Jersey
People from Morristown, New Jersey
Ridge High School alumni
Tisch School of the Arts alumni